William Findlay (22 June 1880 – 19 June 1953) was an English cricketer and administrator.

Life
Findlay was born in Liverpool. He was educated at Eton and Oriel College, Oxford. He played first-class cricket for Lancashire and Oxford University as a batsman and wicket-keeper.

When Albert Chevallier Tayler was preparing his painting, Kent vs Lancashire at Canterbury he arranged sittings with the Kent team. Tayler also intended to do the same with the non-striking Lancashire batsman, Harry Makepeace. Makepeace however was unable to attend a sitting, so Tayler compromised by using Findlay as the batsman. Findlay had not actually played in that particular match, but he was able to travel to Tayler's London studio as he had just been appointed as secretary of Surrey County Cricket Club after his retirement as a cricket player at the end of 1906.

Findley was secretary at Surrey County Cricket Club until 1920 when he was appointed as assistant secretary to Sir Francis Lacey at the Marylebone Cricket Club at Lord's; he succeeded Lacey as secretary in 1926 and served until 1936. He was president of MCC in 1951-52.

References

1880 births
1953 deaths
English cricketers
Lancashire cricketers
Oxford University cricketers
English cricket administrators
Secretaries of the Marylebone Cricket Club
Gentlemen cricketers
Marylebone Cricket Club cricketers
Presidents of the Marylebone Cricket Club
People educated at Eton College
Alumni of Oriel College, Oxford
Wicket-keepers